Tall-e Rigi (also Romanized as Tall-e Rīgī, Tal Rīgī, and Tol Rīgī; also known as Tall-e Rīgī-ye Pā’īn and Tol Rīg) is a village in Khosuyeh Rural District, in the Central District of Zarrin Dasht County, Fars Province, Iran. At the 2006 census, its population was 887, in 197 families.

References 

Populated places in Zarrin Dasht County